Gwangju–Wonju Expressway (2nd Yeongdong Expressway) (Gwangju-Wonju Gosokdoro) is an expressway connecting Gwangju to Yeoju, Yangpyeong County and Wonju. The expressway route number is 52.

Compositions

Speed limit 
 100 km/h

Lanes
 4

Length
 59.65 km

List of facilities 

 IC: Interchange, JC: Junction, SA: Service Area

See also 
Roads and expressways in South Korea
Transportation in South Korea

References

External links
 MOLIT South Korean Government Transport Department

Expressways in South Korea
Roads in Gyeonggi
Roads in Gangwon